"LSD" (stylized "L$D"; abbreviation for Love, Sex, Dreams) is a song by ASAP Rocky, an American hip hop recording artist. It was released on May 21, 2015, as the third single from his second studio album, At. Long. Last. ASAP (2015). The song contains a sample from "Ode to Billie Joe" by Lou Donaldson for the song's drums.

Music video
A music video for the song, directed by Dexter Navy, was released on May 19, 2015. The second half of the music video contains a snippet of "Excuse Me" which also appears on the album. Navy is known for directing other music videos for ASAP Rocky such as Kids Turned Out Fine and ASAP Forever. The video for "LSD" was nominated for Best Music Video at the 58th Annual Grammy Awards. The video directly borrows imagery and was heavily influenced by French director Gaspar Noe's 2009 psychedelic art film Enter the Void. The song came in at number 64 on the Triple J Hottest 100 for 2015.

Awards and nominations

Charts

Certifications

References

External links
 

2015 singles
2014 songs
ASAP Rocky songs
Songs written by ASAP Rocky
Song recordings produced by Jim Jonsin
Songs written by Jim Jonsin
Songs written by Bobbie Gentry
Songs about drugs